Middle Eastern Canadians are Canadians who were either born in or can trace their ancestry to the Middle East, which includes Western Asia and North Africa.

History

Initial settlement 
Individuals from the Middle East first arrived in Canada in 1882, when a group of Syrian and Lebanese immigrants settled in Montreal. Lebanon, Syria, Jordan and Palestine were ruled by the Ottoman Empire at that time. As a result, early Arabic immigrants from these countries were referred to as either Turks or Syrians by Canadian authorities.

20th century 
During World War I, Middle Eastern Canadians of Turkish origin were placed in “enemy alien" internment camps.

The Middle Eastern Canadian population grew rapidly during the latter half of the 20th century; the 1979 Iranian Revolution resulted in a spike of immigration to Canada from the West Asian country.

21st century 
The Syrian refugee crisis during the 2010s fueled further growth to the already existing Syrian population; increased immigration from the West Asian country resulted in Syria becoming the third highest source country of immigration to Canada adding 35,000 Syrians becoming permanent residents in 2016.

Demography

Ethnic and national origins

Language 
The vast majority of Middle Eastern Canadians speak West Asian and North African languages as a mother tongue or second language. The top five middle eastern languages spoken in Canada include Arabic, Farsi, Armenian, Turkish and Hebrew.

Religion 
Islam, Christianity and Judaism are the dominant religions among the middle eastern Canadian population.

Geographical distribution

See also 
 Afghan Canadians
 Armenian Canadians
 Egyptian Canadians
 Iranian Canadians
 Iraqi Canadians
 Israeli Canadians
 Jewish Canadians
 Kurdish Canadians
 Lebanese Canadians
 Moroccan Canadians
 Palestinian Canadians
 Syrian Canadians
 Turkish Canadians

Notes

References 

 
Ethnic groups in Canada